The COPINE Scale is a rating system created in Ireland and used in the United Kingdom to categorise the horrific severity of images of child sex abuse. The scale was developed by staff at the COPINE ("Combating Paedophile Information Networks in Europe") project. The COPINE Project was founded in 1997, and is based in the Department of Applied Psychology, University College Cork, Ireland.

Use

Therapeutic
The COPINE scale was originally developed for therapeutic psychological purposes.

More specifically, it is used to distinguish between child erotica and child pornography.

Professor Max Taylor, one of the academics working for the COPINE project, stated: "The significance of this distinction is to emphasise the potential sexual qualities of a whole range of kinds of photographs (and other material as well) not all of which may meet obscenity criteria."

Judicial
In the late 1990s, the COPINE project at the University College Cork, in cooperation with the Paedophile Unit of the London Metropolitan Police, developed a typology to categorize child abuse images for use in both research and law enforcement. The ten-level typology was based on analysis of images available on websites and internet newsgroups. Other researchers have adopted similar ten-level scales.

The SAP scale
The 2002 case of Regina v. Oliver in the Court of Appeal of England and Wales established a scale by which indecent images of children could be "graded". The five point scale, established by the Sentencing Advisory Panel for England and Wales and adopted in 2002, is known as the SAP scale. It is based on COPINE terminology and is often mistakenly referred to as such.

The SAP document gives a detailed explanation of how the COPINE scale was adapted. It also states that the COPINE scale was intended for therapeutic use and not designed for use in court. Examination of the categories will show that categories 2–5 of the SAP scale obviously correspond to categories 7–10 of the COPINE scale. Category 1 of the SAP scale seems to correspond vaguely to categories 4–6 of the COPINE scale. COPINE category 1 (indicative) was left off the SAP scale because "images of this nature would not be classed as indecent." The board found COPINE categories 2 & 3 to be disputable as to whether or not they can be classified as indecent.

Sexual Offences Definitive Guideline 
On 1 April 2014, a new scale, replacing the SAP scale, was adopted for sentencing in England and Wales for crimes relating to indecent images of children, put into place by page 75 of the Sentencing Council's Sexual Offences Definitive Guideline.

See also
Internet pornography

References

External links 
 COPINE Project
 old link COPINE project (archived)
 Sentencing Guidelines (England and Wales) (This sentencing advice is from 2002 and has been superseded by Sexual Offenses Sentencing Guidelines)

Pornography law
Rating systems
Child pornography